High Standard revolvers were manufactured in a variety of models in .22 Short, .22 Long Rifle and .22 Magnum chambering from 1955 until the mid-1980s.

In 1957 High Standard introduced new models and finishes: a two-inch snubnosed with round butt, a Western model and the successful "Sentinel", one feature that boosted sales was its 9-shot capacity, all models had 9-shot cylinders.

High Standard revolvers are generally considered to be excellent value for money, with an MSRP of $37.50; popular models were the "JC Higgins Model 88" (sold exclusively by Sears) and the "Sentinel" (same gun sold under the High Standard brand), initially released with 4 or 6-inch barrels in blued or nickel finishes, in the mid-1960s, variants had already been launched with 3 and 5-inch barrels and finished in colors such as blue, pink and gold, in addition to a Western model called "Double-Nine".

See also 
 Smith & Wesson Model 317 kit gun
 Ruger Bearcat
 Charter Arms Pathfinder

References

External links 
 The High Standard Sentinel R-103

Revolvers of the United States
.22 LR revolvers